Asplenium carnarvonense is a fern of the family Aspleniaceae native to Carnarvon Gorge in central Queensland.

References

carnarvonense
Ferns of Australia
Flora of Queensland
Plants described in 1998